Niederdorf may refer to:

Places

Germany 
 Niederdorf, Saxony

Italy 
 Niederdorf, South Tyrol, a municipality in South Tyrol

Switzerland 
 Niederdorf, Basel-Landschaft
 Niederdorf, Zürich, a section of the old town in the City of Zürich
 Niederdorf district

See also
 Niederndorf (disambiguation)